The Outland Trophy is awarded to the best college football interior lineman in the United States as adjudged by the Football Writers Association of America.  It is named after John H. Outland. One of only a few players ever to be named an All-American at two positions, Outland garnered consensus All-America honors in 1898 as a tackle and consensus honors as a halfback in 1899. Outland had always contended that football tackles and guards deserved greater recognition and conceived the Outland Trophy as a means of providing this recognition. In 1988, Jim Ridlon was commissioned to design and sculpt the Outland Trophy. A member of the National College Football Awards Association, the award has become one of college football's most prestigious.

Winners

See also 
 Lombardi Award
 Rimington Trophy
 UPI Lineman of the Year (College)

References

External links
Outland Trophy website

College football national player awards
Awards established in 1946
1946 establishments in the United States